Sir Robert Kennaway Douglas (23 August 1838 – 20 May 1913) was a British oriental scholar.

Life
He was born at Larkbeare House, Talaton, Devon on 23 August 1838, the fourth son of the Rev. Philip William Douglas. His father was appointed to the Chapel of ease at Escot, Ottery St. Mary, Devon, by Sir John Kennaway, Bart. His paternal grandfather was Dr. Philip Douglas, Master of Corpus Christi College, Cambridge. Douglas attended Blandford Grammar School.

Douglas was in China with the consular service, from 1858 to 1865. He then became Professor of Chinese at King's College, London. 

He was vice president of the Royal Asiatic Society, and the first Keeper of the British Museum's new Department of Oriental Printed Books and Manuscripts when it was created in 1892. He was knighted in 1903 and died a decade later, on 20 May 1913.

Works
Douglas wrote books on China, including:

 China, New York, P. F. Collier and Son, 1913 (The Story of Nations)
 A Chinese Manual, comprising a Condensed Grammar with Idiomatic Phrases and Dialogues (London: Crosby Lockwood and Son, 1904)
 Confucianism and Taoism
The Language and Literature of China (1875), Royal Institution lectures
 The Life of Li Hung-Chang

During the 1890s Douglas collaborated on short stories with Elizabeth Thomasina Meade. He wrote articles for the Dictionary of National Biography and for the Nine Edition (1875-1889), Tenth Edition (1902-03) and Eleventh Edition (1911) of the Encyclopædia Britannica.

Family
Douglas married Rachel Charlotte Kirkby, née Fenton, (1842–1921) in 1867. Among their children were:

 Archibald Philip Douglas (1867–1953)
 Robert Noel Douglas, second son, (1868–1957)
 James Douglas, third son, (1870–1958)
 Sholto Douglas (1873–1916)
 Stuart Monro Douglas, sixth son, (born 1879)

References

External links
 
 
 

1838 births
1913 deaths
Academics of King's College London
British orientalists
Employees of the British Museum
Fellows of the Royal Asiatic Society
Knights Bachelor